Nicholas Allan (born 11 December 1956) is a British children's writer and illustrator.

Biography 

Nicholas Allan was born and brought up in Brighton, England, attending Brighton College from 1970 to 1975. He studied at the Slade School of Art and completed an MA in creative writing at the University of East Anglia. He published his first book The Hefty Fairy in 1989, and has since published numerous books for children, including The Magic Lavatory, Demon Teddy, The Queen's Knickers, Where Willy Went and Father Christmas Needs a Wee. Hilltop Hospital has been adapted into an award-winning television series. His other books include The Complete Guide to Gatecrashing and a teenage novel The First Time.

Allan has funded the Society of Authors' Queen's Knickers Award, an annual award for an illustrated children's book. The award was founded in 2020 and is named after his 1993 book The Queen's Knickers.

When not touring, Allan spends most of his time in Brighton, not London.

References

External links 
Author biography at A. M. Heath agency
Author information at Class Act Agency
Author biography at Random House Books
 

English children's writers
People educated at Brighton College
Alumni of the University of East Anglia
Living people
1956 births